The 19055/19056 Valsad - Jodhpur Weekly Express is an express train belonging to Western Railway zone that runs between Valsad and Jodhpur Junction in India. It is currently being operated with 19055/19056 train numbers on a weekly basis.

On 29 January 2019, Upgraded rake of Western Railway under ‘Project Utkrisht’ with beautiful interiors & many passengers friendly new features was introduced in Valsad - Jodhpur Weekly Express.

Service

The 19055/Valsad - Jodhpur Weekly Express has an average speed of 54 km/hr and covers 754 km in 13h 25m.

The 19056/Jodhpur - Valsad Weekly Express has an average speed of 53 km/hr and covers 754 km in 13h 40m.

Route and halts 

The important halts of the train are:

Coach composite

The train has standard ICF rakes with max speed of 130 kmph. The train consists of 22 coaches :

 2 AC II Tier 
 6 AC III Tier
 8 Sleeper Coaches
 4 General Unreserved
 2 End-on Generator

Traction

Both trains are hauled by a Vadodara Loco Shed based WAP-7 electric locomotive from Valsad to Ahmedabad. From Ahmedabad trains are hauled by a Vatva Loco Shed based WDM-3A diesel locomotive uptil Jodhpur.

Schedule

Rake Sharing 

The train shares its rake with 22909/22910 Valsad-Puri Superfast Express.

Notes

See also 

 Valsad railway station
 Jodhpur Junction railway station
 Valsad-Puri Superfast Express

References

External links 

 19055/Valsad - Jodhpur Weekly Express
 19056/Jodhpur - Valsad Weekly Express

Transport in Jodhpur
Transport in Valsad
Express trains in India
Rail transport in Rajasthan
Rail transport in Gujarat
Railway services introduced in 2012